Carolyn Presutti is a Voice of America (VOA) senior television correspondent based in Washington, DC.

Education and career 

Presutti was raised by Clara and Dominic Presutti in Bellaire, Ohio. Her ancestry is Italian. Dominic enlisted in the United States Navy during World War II and witnessed the iconic flag- raising during the Battle of Iwo Jima. Later, he co-owned and managed Ohio Fireworks Mfg. & Display Co. 

Carolyn Presutti graduated from the University of Akron.

She began her journalism career at WHBC Radio in Canton, Ohio, and WKBN Radio in Youngstown, Ohio.

She moved into television at WFMJ-TV in Youngstown, Ohio, as chief weathercaster and nightside reporter. Then, she was a state capital reporter and weekend anchor at WTVR-TV in Richmond, Virginia. She worked for Baltimore, Maryland's WMAR-TV until 1994. Presutti was subsequently a morning anchor at WUSA-TV in Washington, DC, making public appearances and serving as emcee at the 1996 Sons of Italy Banquet, which was attended by Senator Bob Dole, Alfred Checchi and Joe Paterno. In 1996, she joined A.H. Belo broadcasting group, where she co-hosted the weekly political talk show “Capital Conversation,” with Dallas Morning News bureau chief Carl Luebsdorf. Presutti joined VOA in 2007.

In 2011, VOA sent Presutti to Haiti for the anniversary of the 2010 earthquake. There, she conducted exclusive interviews with the President of Haiti, Michel Martelly, and was invited to join the presidential motorcade. She also conducted the first interview with Sophia Martelly after she became Haiti's first lady. Presutti's feature story on an amputee Haitian soccer team won an Associated Press award.

Presutti provided initial coverage following the 2013 Boston Marathon bombing, returning to report on the event's first anniversary. In 2014, she partnered with a cappella group, Pentatonix, to cover the first use of Google Glass at a professional concert. Presutti covered Hillary Clinton's headquarters and concession speech after the candidate's 2016 presidential election loss. In 2019, she led the US coverage of the agency-wide project, The Worth of a Girl, which won numerous national and international awards. Presutti covered the 2020 election and Joe Biden's acceptance speech in Wilmington, Delaware.

Film and video 
In addition to journalism, Presutti has appeared as a television news anchor in the Netflix series House of Cards, headlined by Kevin Spacey and Robin Wright, and as a U.S. senator's wife in the HBO series Veep alongside Julia Louis-Dreyfus. After appearing as an extra in the 2010 romantic comedy How Do You Know, starring Reese Witherspoon and Owen Wilson, she published an article about her experience in Washingtonian Magazine.

Awards

References

External links 
Carolyn Presutti at VOA 
 
Presutti, Carolyn. “VOA Correspondent Carolyn Presutti Says Pennsylvania Holds Key To US Presidential Elections 2020.” YouTube, Voice of America, 3 Nov. 2020, www.youtube.com/watch?v=XqwcgA1oTx4.

Year of birth missing (living people)
Living people